My Years with Apu: A Memoir, first published in 1994, is a memoir by the Indian film director Satyajit Ray.

Synopsis
The memoir describes Ray's experience and thoughts during the making of the acclaimed Apu Trilogy.

Publication history
The book was published posthumously two years after his death.

Reception
It garnered praise for its "fascinating account" on making the trilogy.

See also
Cinema of India
Modernist film
Social realism

References

Books about film
Books by Satyajit Ray
1994 books